Panic of '07 or Panic of 07 may refer to:

 Panic of 1907
 Financial crisis of 2007–2008
 Subprime mortgage crisis